The following outline is provided as an overview of and topical guide to Peru:

Peru – country located in  western South America, on the Pacific Coast, north of Chile. Peruvian territory was home to several ancient cultures.  Ranging from the Norte Chico civilization in the 32nd century BC, the oldest civilization in the Americas and one of the five cradles of civilization, to the Inca Empire, the largest state in pre-Columbian America, the territory now including Peru has one of the longest histories of civilization of any country, tracing its heritage back to the 4th millennia BCE. The Spanish Empire conquered the region in the 16th century and established a Viceroyalty, which included most of its South American colonies. After achieving independence in 1821, Peru has undergone periods of political unrest and fiscal crisis as well as periods of stability and economic upswing.

General reference 

 Pronunciation: 
 Common English country name:  Peru
 Official English country name:  The Republic of Peru
 Common endonym(s): Perú, Piruw
 Official endonym(s): República del Perú, Piruw Hapan llaqta, Piruw Suyu
 Adjectival(s): Peruvian
 Demonym(s): Peruvians
 Etymology: Name of Peru
 International rankings of Peru
 ISO country codes:  PE, PER, 604
 ISO region codes:  See ISO 3166-2:PE
 Internet country code top-level domain:  .pe

Geography of Peru 

Geography of Peru
 Peru is: a megadiverse country
 Location:
 Southern Hemisphere
 Western Hemisphere
Americas
 Latin America
 South America
 Time in Peru
 Time zone:  UTC-05
 Extreme points of Peru
 High:  Huascarán  – highest point in the Tropics
 Low:  South Pacific Ocean 0 m
 Land boundaries:  7,461 km
 2,995 km
 1,800 km
 1,420 km
 1,075 km
 171 km
 Coastline:  South Pacific Ocean 2,414 km
 Population of Peru: 28,750,770 (June 30, 2007)  - 40th most populous country
 Area of Peru:   - 20th largest country
 Atlas of Peru

Environment of Peru 

 Climate of Peru
 Environmental issues in Peru
 Renewable energy in Peru
 Geology of Peru
 List of earthquakes in Peru
 Natural regions of Peru
 Protected areas of Peru
 Biosphere reserves in Peru
 National parks of Peru
 Wildlife of Peru
 Flora of Peru
 Fauna of Peru
 Birds of Peru
 Mammals of Peru

Natural geographic features of Peru 

 Fjords of Peru
 Glaciers of Peru
 Islands of Peru
 Lakes of Peru
 Mountains of Peru
 Volcanoes in Peru
 Peru–Chile Trench
 Rivers of Peru
 Waterfalls of Peru
 Valleys of Peru
 World Heritage Sites in Peru

Regions of Peru

Administrative divisions of Peru 

Administrative divisions of Peru
 Regions of Peru
 Provinces of Peru
 Districts of Peru
 Populated centers of Peru
 Former regions of Peru
 Municipalities of Peru

Regions of Peru 

Regions of Peru
Peru is divided into 25 regions and the province of Lima.

Provinces of Peru 

Provinces of Peru

Districts of Peru 

Districts of Peru

Municipalities of Peru 

Municipalities of Peru
 Capital of Peru: Lima
 Cities of Peru

Demography of Peru 

Demographics of Peru
 Census in Peru

Neighbours of Peru 
Peru is bordered by:
 Bolivia
 Brazil
 Chile
 Colombia
 Ecuador

Government and politics of Peru 

Politics of Peru
 Form of government: unitary semi-presidential representative democratic republic
 Capital of Peru: Lima
 Census in Peru
 Communism in Peru
 Decentralization process in Peru
 Elections in Peru
 Peruvian electoral system
 Voting in Peru is compulsory (until the age of 70)
 Peruvian presidential elections:   1895 - 1899 - 2000 - 2001 - 2006 - 2011
 Peruvian parliamentary elections:   1978 - 1992 - 2000 - 2001 - 2006 - 2011
 Liberalism in Peru
 Political parties in Peru
 2009 Peruvian political crisis
 Taxation in Peru

Branches of the government of Peru 

 Government of Peru

Executive branch of the government of Peru 
 Head of state and head of government: President of Peru, Martín Vizcarra
 Vice Presidents of Peru: Mercedes Aráoz 
 Cabinet: Council of Ministers of Peru
 Ministries of Peru
 Prime Minister of Peru, Fernando Zavala
 Ministry of Agriculture of Peru
 Ministry of Economy and Finance of Peru
 Ministry of Defense of Peru
 Ministry of Education of Peru
 Ministry of Energy and Mines of Peru
 Ministry of Environment of Peru
 Ministry of Foreign Commerce and Tourism of Peru
 Ministry of Foreign Relations of Peru
 Ministry of Health of Peru
 Ministry of Housing, Construction and Sanitation of Peru
 Ministry of the Interior of Peru
 Ministry of Justice of Peru
 Ministry of Labor and Promotion of Employment of Peru
 Ministry of Production of Peru
 Ministry of Transportation and Communication of Perú
 Ministry of Women and Social Development of Peru

Legislative branch of the government of Peru 

 Parliament of Peru: Congress of the Republic (unicameral)
 Members of Congress

Judicial branch of the government of Peru 

 Judicial system of Peru
 Constitutional Court of Peru - interprets the constitution on matters of individual rights
 Supreme Court of Peru - located in the Palace of Justice
 Superior Courts of Justice of Peru preside over the Judicial Districts of Peru
 Courts of First Instance of Peru hold jurisdiction over each province
 Courts of Peace of Peru each have jurisdiction over a single district

Foreign relations of Peru 

 Foreign relations of Peru
 Diplomatic missions in Peru
 Diplomatic missions of Peru
 Chile–Peru relations

International organization membership 
The Republic of Peru is a member of:

Agency for the Prohibition of Nuclear Weapons in Latin America and the Caribbean (OPANAL)
Andean Community of Nations (CAN)
Asia-Pacific Economic Cooperation (APEC)
Food and Agriculture Organization (FAO)
Group of 15 (G15)
Group of 24 (G24)
Group of 77 (G77)
Inter-American Development Bank (IADB)
International Atomic Energy Agency (IAEA)
International Bank for Reconstruction and Development (IBRD)
International Civil Aviation Organization (ICAO)
International Criminal Court (ICCt)
International Criminal Police Organization (Interpol)
International Development Association (IDA)
International Federation of Red Cross and Red Crescent Societies (IFRCS)
International Finance Corporation (IFC)
International Fund for Agricultural Development (IFAD)
International Hydrographic Organization (IHO)
International Labour Organization (ILO)
International Maritime Organization (IMO)
International Mobile Satellite Organization (IMSO)
International Monetary Fund (IMF)
International Olympic Committee (IOC)
International Organization for Migration (IOM)
International Organization for Standardization (ISO)
International Red Cross and Red Crescent Movement (ICRM)
International Telecommunication Union (ITU)
International Telecommunications Satellite Organization (ITSO)
International Trade Union Confederation (ITUC)
Inter-Parliamentary Union (IPU)

Latin American Economic System (LAES)
Latin American Integration Association (LAIA)
Multilateral Investment Guarantee Agency (MIGA)
Nonaligned Movement (NAM)
Organisation for the Prohibition of Chemical Weapons (OPCW)
Organization of American States (OAS)
Permanent Court of Arbitration (PCA)
Rio Group (RG)
Southern Cone Common Market (Mercosur) (associate)
Unión Latina
Union of South American Nations (UNASUR)
United Nations (UN)
United Nations Conference on Trade and Development (UNCTAD)
United Nations Educational, Scientific, and Cultural Organization (UNESCO)
United Nations Industrial Development Organization (UNIDO)
United Nations Mission in Liberia (UNMIL)
United Nations Mission in the Sudan (UNMIS)
United Nations Operation in Cote d'Ivoire (UNOCI)
United Nations Organization Mission in the Democratic Republic of the Congo (MONUC)
United Nations Stabilization Mission in Haiti (MINUSTAH)
Universal Postal Union (UPU)
World Confederation of Labour (WCL)
World Customs Organization (WCO)
World Federation of Trade Unions (WFTU)
World Health Organization (WHO)
World Intellectual Property Organization (WIPO)
World Meteorological Organization (WMO)
World Tourism Organization (UNWTO)
World Trade Organization (WTO)

Law and order in Peru 

 Capital punishment in Peru
 Constitution of Peru
 Crime in Peru
 Domestic violence in Peru
 Human rights in Peru
 Abortion in Peru
 LGBT rights in Peru
 Freedom of religion in Peru
 Law enforcement in Peru
 National Police of Peru
 Nationality law of Peru

Military of Peru 

Military of Peru
 Command
 Commander-in-chief:
 Ministry of Defense of Peru
 Joint Command of the Armed Forces of Peru
 Forces
 Army of Peru
 Navy of Peru
 Air Force of Peru
 Special forces of Peru
 Military history of Peru
 Military ranks of Peru

Local government in Peru 
 Regional Governments of Peru

History of Peru

By period 
 Ancient civilizations of Peru
 Cultural periods of Peru
 Inca Empire
 Spanish conquest of Peru
 Neo-Inca State
 Viceroyalty of Peru
 Peruvian War of Independence
 Guano era in Peru
 War of the Pacific
 Colombia-Peru War
 Ecuadorian–Peruvian War
 Internal conflict in Peru

By subject 

 Agricultural history of Peru
 Demographic history of Peru
 Economic history of Peru
 Homosexuality in ancient Peru
 Military history of Peru

By type of event 
 Massacres in Peru

Culture of Peru 

Culture of Peru
 Architecture of Peru
 Inca architecture
 Peruvian colonial architecture
 Peruvian Viceroyal architecture
 Cuisine of Peru
 Festivals in Peru
 Languages of Peru
 Media in Peru
 Metrication in Peru
 National symbols of Peru
 Coat of arms of Peru
 Flag of Peru
 National anthem of Peru
 Cockade of Peru (unofficial national symbol)
 People of Peru
 Indigenous peoples in Peru
 Prostitution in Peru
 Public holidays in Peru
 Records of Peru
 Scouting and Guiding in Peru
 Television in Peru
 World Heritage Sites in Peru

Art in Peru 
 Art in Peru
 Cinema of Peru
 Literature of Peru
 Music of Peru
 Television in Peru
 Theatre in Peru

Religion in Peru 

Religion in Peru
 Christianity in Peru
 Roman Catholicism in Peru
 Roman Catholic dioceses in Peru
 Hinduism in Peru
 Islam in Peru
 Judaism in Peru
 Sikhism in Peru

Sports in Peru 

Sports in Peru
 Football in Peru
 Chile and Peru football rivalry
 Football clubs in Peru
 Football stadiums in Peru
 Peru national football team
 Peru at the Olympics
 Tennis in Peru
 Peru Davis Cup team
 Rugby union in Peru
 Surfing in Peru

Economy and infrastructure of Peru 

Economy of Peru
 Economic rank, by nominal GDP (2007): 54th (fifty-fourth)
 Agriculture in Peru
 Banking in Peru
 National Bank of Peru
 Central Reserve Bank of Peru
 Communications in Peru
 Internet in Peru
 Media in Peru
 Newspapers in Peru
 List of postal codes in Peru
 Telephone numbers in Peru
 Companies of Peru
Currency of Peru: Sol
ISO 4217: PEN
 Economic history of Peru
 Energy in Peru
 Electric power in Peru
 Energy policy of Peru
 Oil industry in Peru
 Health care in Peru
 HIV/AIDS in Peru
 Hospitals in Peru
 Mining in Peru
 Peru Stock Exchange
 Tourism in Peru
 Transport in Peru
 Airports in Peru
 Rail transport in Peru
 Roads in Peru
 Highways in Peru
 Water resources management in Peru
 Irrigation in Peru
 Water supply and sanitation in Peru

Education in Peru 

Education in Peru

See also 

Peru
Index of Peru-related articles
Iperu, tourist information and assistance
List of international rankings
List of Peru-related topics
Member state of the United Nations
Outline of geography
Outline of South America

References

External links 

 Government
  Web portal of the Peruvian Government
  Directory of Peruvian Government websites

 General reference
 BBC country profile of Peru
 Peru. The World Factbook. Central Intelligence Agency.
 Encyclopædia Britannica entry on Peru
 Peru web directory 

 Other
 
 

Peru